Xylotheca is a genus of flowering plants in the Achariaceae family. The genus is found in central and southern Africa, and Madagascar.

Species
Xylotheca capreifolia
Xylotheca kraussiana
Xylotheca longipes
Xylotheca tettensis

References

Achariaceae
Malpighiales genera